

References
National holidays of Georgia - Article 30

Georgia
Public holidays in Georgia (country)
Society of Georgia (country)
Holidays